Eaglesvale may refer to the following institutions in Harare, Zimbabwe:
 Eaglesvale High School
 Eaglesvale Preparatory School